Julián Simón Carranza (born 22 May 2000) is an Argentine professional footballer who plays as a forward for the Philadelphia Union of Major League Soccer.

Club career

Banfield
Carranza's career began in 2017 with Argentine Primera División side Banfield. His first appearance for Banfield came against Defensa y Justicia in the league on 24 November, coming on as a 55th-minute substitute for Michael López. In his third appearance, Carranza scored two goals in a home defeat versus Argentinos Juniors on 9 December. He ended 2017–18 with five goals in fourteen league fixtures, subsequently netting a further five times in all competitions in 2018–19.

Inter Miami
On 26 July 2019, Major League Soccer's Inter Miami signed Carranza. However, he was loaned back to Banfield until January 2020; when Inter Miami would officially join MLS. Having returned from his homeland in early 2020, Carranza's competitive bow wouldn't arrive until midway through the year due to the COVID-19 pandemic. His first appearance belatedly arrived on 8 July in an MLS is Back Tournament loss to Orlando City. Carranza would later, on 22 August, score twice on his MLS regular season debut versus the same opponents.

Loan back to Banfield
Carranza spent five months back with Banfield to end 2019 after his transfer to Inter Miami, due to the newly formed American club not joining Major League Soccer until the succeeding January. He made twelve appearances in his second spell, whilst netting goals against Godoy Cruz and Lanús. His last appearance came in a win away to Independiente on 6 December 2019.

Philadelphia Union 
In December 2021, it was announced that Carranza would spend the 2022 season on loan with the Philadelphia Union, in exchange for a second-round selection in the 2022 SuperDraft.

On 2 April 2022, Carranza scored his first goal for the Philadelphia Union in a 2–0 home victory over Charlotte FC. On 12 July, he netted his first career hat-trick in a 7–0 home victory over D.C. United, becoming the fifth player in the Union's history to achieve the feat. He was voted MLS Player of the Week. On 13 July, Philadelphia opted to make Carranza's move to the club permanent, sending Miami $500,000 of General Allocation Money. On 21 August, he bagged a second-half hat-trick in a 6–0 away win over D.C. United, becoming the first Union player to score multiple hat-tricks, and joining Cobi Jones as the only players to have scored two hat-tricks against the same side in a single MLS season. Carranza also became the first Philadelphia player to score three goals and register an assist in the same match, and by being voted MLS Player of the Week again, he became only the second Union player after Sébastien Le Toux (2010) to win the award twice in the same season.

International career
Carranza featured in two matches for the Argentina U17 team at the 2017 South American Championship in Chile. He also featured in friendlies for the U17s, versus Godoy Cruz and Racing Club respectively; scoring twice against Godoy and once against Racing. Carranza has also trained with the U20 team. September 2019 saw Carranza make Fernando Batista's U23 squad.

Career statistics

References

External links

2000 births
Living people
Sportspeople from Córdoba Province, Argentina
Argentine footballers
Argentina youth international footballers
Association football forwards
Argentine expatriate footballers
Expatriate soccer players in the United States
Argentine expatriate sportspeople in the United States
Argentine Primera División players
Major League Soccer players
Club Atlético Banfield footballers
Inter Miami CF players
Philadelphia Union players
Designated Players (MLS)